The Library is one of the central support services of IIT Bombay. The mission of the Library is to provide information services and access to bibliographic and full text digital and printed resources in order to support the scholarly and information needs of the students, faculty and staff at the Institute Community.

Building Plan 

The library occupies an independent five-storey building.

Renovated Library with a beautiful entrance lobby and exhibit area, reorganized reference and periodicals reading halls, provided a variety of user spaces for individual studies with wifi and laptop plugging facility. Improved staff work area and a large reading hall open for 24×7.

Library Services 
The library offers circulation of books, and also a bookbank of textbooks for loan to students whose parent's income falls below the taxable limit.

The library maintains Inter-Library Loan relations with a number of institutions and libraries including IITs, BARC, NITIE, NCST, IISc, IIG, TIFR, IGIDR, TISS and NICT for exchange of books, journals, photocopies and videocassette

Library Collection 

The Library receives 450 print periodicals. Apart from this it has books and theses and dissertations, standards and reports, pamphlets which are approximately 5 lakhs. There are 1000 CDs and 231 DVDs.
The Central Library provides web-based access to over 450 books, 12,000 full text journals and 10 databases 24 x 7 on institute-wide network as per the following details.

Institutional Repository 

The IIT Bombay Institutional repository is an electronic collection of research produced at IITB, including full-text book chapters, conference/proceeding papers, technical reports, journal pre prints & post-prints, working papers, Patents and annual reports.

ETD (Electronic Theses Dissertation)
The Library supports electronic submission of theses and dissertations by postgraduate and doctoral students. During 2017-2018 year 749 Master's degree dissertations, 367 PhD theses and 239 Dual degree theses are submitted and approved by supervisor via this system.

Staff 
Dr. Manju Naika is the current Chief library Officer.

External links 
Official Website

References 
Annual Report of IIT Bombay Library Annual Report of ITT Bombay Library 2010-11
Annual Report of IIT Bombay Library Annual Report of IIT Bombay Library 2009-10
Annual Report of IIT Bombay Library Annual Report of IIT Bombay Library 2008-09
 Ganpule S. R. and Waydande H. S."Computerization of IIT Bombay Central Library: Cost Benefit Approach" IN CURRENT TRENDS IN INFORMATION TECHNOLOGY: IMPACT ON INFORMATION SCIENCE IN INDIA ed by Kuldeep Chand., Society for Information Science, New Delhi.,1993, p.
 -46.
 Ghosh, Maitraiee. "Digital Infrastructure and attitude towards access and sharing: A case study of Selected Engineering Libraries in the Maharashtra State of India." International Information and Library Review 41, no.2(2009),
 Jadhav, Mahendra N. and Bamane, Niranjana J. "Electronic Theses and Dissertations (ETD): An initiative at Central Library, Indian Institute of Technology, Bombay. Available at: http://docs.ndltd.org:8080/dspace/bitstream/2340/208/1/1074244208-text.pdf
 Jadhav, Mahendra N. and Kulkarni, Shobha Electronic Security: A case study of IIT Bombay Central Library. Available at http://ir.inflibnet.ac.in/dxml/bitstream/handle/1944/181/03cali_12.pdf?sequence=2
 Jotwani, Daulat (2005). Library portal – a knowledge management tool. In Multilingual computing and information management in networked
 digital environment. ed. Murthy T.A.V. et al. (pp. 612–620). Ahmedabad: INFLIBNET Centre.

Indian Institutes of Technology
Academic libraries in India
Libraries in Mumbai
Libraries established in 1958